Bracca is a comune (municipality) in the Province of Bergamo in the Italian region of Lombardy, located about  northeast of Milan and about  northeast of Bergamo.

Bracca borders the following municipalities: Algua, Costa di Serina, San Pellegrino Terme, Zogno.

Demographic evolution

References